The Cathedral of Our Lady of the Pillar or simply Cathedral of Barinas, is a religious building belonging to the Catholic Church and is located in Briceño Mendez Avenue in front of the Bolivar Square in the city of Barinas, the capital of Barinas State, in the plains region of the country South American of Venezuela.

The cathedral follows the Roman or Latin rite and serves as the seat of the Diocese of Barinas (Dioecesis Barinensis) that was created on July 23, 1965, with the papal bull Apostolicum munus of Pope Paul VI. It is under the pastoral responsibility of the Bishop Jesús Alfonso Guerrero Contreras, O.F.M. Cap. As its name implies was dedicated to the Virgin Mary in her title of Our Lady of the Pillar.

It is a structure dating from the Spanish colonial era being built between 1770 and 1780. It is an important tourist attraction and a religious monument of great historical value.

See also
List of cathedrals in Venezuela
Our Lady of the Pillar
Roman Catholicism in Venezuela

References

Roman Catholic cathedrals in Venezuela
Barinas, Venezuela
Roman Catholic churches completed in 1780
18th-century Roman Catholic church buildings in Venezuela